River Street may refer to:

 River Street (Erie Railroad station), a former railroad station for the Erie Railroad
 River Street (film), a 1996 Australian film
 River Street, Hackensack, part of County Route 503, New Jersey
River Street (Savannah, Georgia)
River Street Historic District (New Haven, Connecticut)

See also
 River Street Tower, Manchester, UK

Road disambiguation pages